Le bahut va craquer (Schools Falling Apart)  is a film directed by Michel Nerval released in 1981 .

A Parisian School: The young girl Beatrice (Fanny Bastien), who lives alone with her mother (Dany Carrel) is pregnant. The school's headmaster (Michel Galabru) decides to decriut Bea at the door. The other Students unite to sequesting the headmaster in company of the tutor in math (Darry Cowl) and the teacher of philosophy (Claude Jade) ... The principal, the math teacher and the teacher of philosophy will become the hostages of students and pay for their misunderstanding.

Cast 
 Michel Galabru : Principal
 Claude Jade : Teacher of Philosophy
 Darry Cowl : Teacher of Math
 Robert Castel : Teacher of English
 Henri Guybet : A Pawn
 Fanny Bastien : Bea 
 Dany Carrel : Bea's Mother
 Caroline Béranger : Véronique
 Eric Civanyan : Francis
 Katia Tchenko : Francis's sister
 Jacques Monod : Police Inspector
 Anne Benoît
Serge Guirchoun (le voyou dans le café)

Links
Le Bahut va craquer in IMDb
Schools falling Apart in Unifrance

1981 films
French comedy films
1980s French films